In computing, the User Programmatic Interface (UPI), also known as the User Program Interface, consists of a set of C-language software APIs which provide the lowest-level API-based interface to the Oracle database.

Overview
UPI offers a procedural API for not only performing certain database administration tasks (such as system startup and shutdown), but also for using PL/SQL or SQL to query, access, and manipulate data.  The UPI library, an undocumented API used internally by Oracle, deals directly with the Two-Task Common (TTC)
aspect of the Oracle Client software stack.

UPI-based applications
Several Oracle database applications depend on UPI, including:

 Oracle Forms
 SQL*Plus (also uses OCI)
 Oracle Corporation's data-import and -export (IMP/EXP) utilities

UPI-Based Libraries
Several libraries depend on UPI, including:

 Oracle's FormsAPI
 The Oracle Call Interface Library
 Oracle's SQLLIB (used by Oracle's Embedded SQL Precompilers)

External links
 Oracle SQL*Net Overview (includes basic UPI information)

References 

Oracle software